Théo Guivarch (born 17 November 1995) is a French professional footballer who plays as a goalkeeper for Swiss club Neuchâtel Xamax.

Career
Born in Lorient, Guivarch began playing football with local side FC Lorient. He did not make any Ligue 1 appearances for the club, and moved to EA Guingamp.

In June 2018, Guivarch agreed a loan move to SO Cholet.

Personal life
Guivarch is not related to former France international footballer Stéphane Guivarc'h.

References

Living people
1996 births
Sportspeople from Lorient
French footballers
Association football goalkeepers
Ligue 1 players
Championnat National players
Swiss Challenge League players
FC Lorient players
En Avant Guingamp players
US Concarneau players
SO Cholet players
Rodez AF players
Neuchâtel Xamax FCS players
Footballers from Brittany
French expatriate footballers
French expatriate sportspeople in Switzerland
Expatriate footballers in Switzerland